Machiel van Keulen (born 1984/1985) is a Dutch former professional footballer. Although primarily a midfielder, he was able to play in multiple positions.

Career
Van Keulen began his career with Heracles Almelo, spending six years with the club, including two years with the first-team. For Heracles he made two appearances in the Eerste Divisie and two appearances in the KNVB Cup. After eleven seasons with SVZW, he signed for Hulzense Boys for the 2016–17 season.

References

1980s births
Living people
Dutch footballers
Heracles Almelo players
SV Zwaluwen Wierden players
Eerste Divisie players
Association football midfielders
Association football utility players